In Namibia, the issue of labor hire remains a controversy between the government, unions and labor brokering companies. The ILO categorizes two forms of subcontracting, namely job contracting (where a subcontractor supplies goods or services) and labor-only contracting (the sub-contractor supplies labor only). Most of Namibia’s labor hire companies fall into the second category as they merely supply labor to their clients.  
 
The workers, known as contractors, field employees, temps, on-hired employees or even just employees, are employed by the labour hire organisation. They are not employed by the company to whom they provide labour. This is an important distinction for the purposes of Occupational Healthy and Safety (OH&S) purposes, in particular who has legislative responsibility for ensuring a safe working environment. This has been tested in court Labour hire when the Africa Labour Services (ALS) lodged an application with the court challenging the amendment of the Labour Act 11 of 2007 by the government that prohibits the hiring out and employing of casual workers in Namibia. According to the heads of argument of the applicants, the provisions of section 128 demands that the user enterprises, among others, to offer labour hire employees the same benefits as their own employees. The arguments a mostly centered between the high unemployment rate in Namibia and the worker's rights, where the government describe labour hire practice as a form of exploitation to the workers much more like during the colonial era.

See also

 Labour hire
 Employment agency
 Temporary work

By country

Labour brokering (Southern Africa)
Labour hire (Australia)

References

External links 
Namibia’s labour movement: Prospects and challenges for 2017 and beyond
RESTRICTIVE LABOUR LEGISLATION IN NAMIBIA AND ITS NEGATIVE EFFECT ON JOB CREATION

Economy of Namibia
Labor rights